Andrés Longton Herrera (born 26 May 1982) is a Chilean lawyer and politician.

He was massively known for participate in the reality show Mundos Opuestos algonside his brother Arturo.

References

External links
 

1982 births
Living people
Adolfo Ibáñez University alumni
Pontifical Catholic University of Valparaíso alumni
21st-century Chilean politicians
National Renewal (Chile) politicians
People from Viña del Mar
Chilean television personalities